Sweet Girl is the sixth "mini-album" EP released by South Korean boy group B1A4 under WM Entertainment. The album was released on August 10, 2015 by WM Entertainment and distributed by LOEN Entertainment. The title song of the album, "Sweet Girl", along with the other songs, was produced by leader Jinyoung. CNU also produced one song in the album called "Love is Magic". B1A4 won a trophy with "Sweet Girl" on the August 19 episode of MBC Every1 Show Champion and earned the title of the tenth most watched Korean music video in America for August by Billboard.

Teasers
B1A4 posted five red-tinted images on Facebook and Twitter of the individual members showing off a new mature B1A4. On July 31, 2015, B1A4 posted a teaser video of all five songs on the album and a music video teaser on August 4, 2015. On August 6, they held a Guerilla Concert which was broadcast live via Naver V app where they debuted three songs from their new album including "Sweet Girl". The official music video for "Sweet Girl" was released August 10, 2015 alongside their album.

Track listing

Charts

Notes

References

2015 EPs
B1A4 EPs
Kakao M EPs